ACMS may refer to:
 The Adventist Church Management system, the system for managing adventists church members
 Advanced Combat Man System, the Singapore Armed Forces Future Soldier project
 Aircraft Condition Monitor System
 Allianze University College of Medical Sciences, located in Kepala Batas, Pulau Pinang, Malaysia. It specialises in medicine and Allied Health Sciences education
 The Alternative Comedy Memorial Society, a British comedy night for alternative and experimental work
 American Center for Mongolian Studies, an American Overseas Research Center (AORC) in Ulaanbaatar, Mongolia, and Philadelphia, PA
 American College of Mohs Surgery
 Anne Chesnutt Middle School in Fayetteville, North Carolina
 Antelope Crossing Middle School in Antelope, California
 Application Control Management System, a transaction processing management software for computers running the OpenVMS operating system
 Arbor Creek Middle School in Carrollton, Texas
 Army College of Medical Sciences, New Delhi
 Automatic channel memory system is a system in which a video system such as VCR could search and memorize broadcasting system automatically
 Association of Christians in the Mathematical Sciences
 Atlanta Charter Middle School in Atlanta, Georgia
 Australian Clay Minerals Society, an Australian scientific society for studying of clay minerals and allied substance
 Australian Computer Museum Society Inc, an Australian charitable institution dedicated to the preservation of computing history within Australia and abroad